Opistoclanis is a genus of moths in the family Sphingidae, containing only one species Opistoclanis hawkeri.

Distribution 
which is known from Yunnan in China, north-eastern Thailand, Laos and northern Vietnam, where it has been recorded at elevations between 888 and 2,800 meters.

Description

Biology 
Adults are on wing from late March to early May at the end of the dry season in Thailand.

References

Smerinthini
Monotypic moth genera
Taxa named by Karl Jordan
Moths described in 1921
Moths of Asia